WWDL is a Christian radio station licensed to Plainfield, Indiana, broadcasting on 91.3 MHz FM. The station serves Southwestern Indianapolis and its Southwest Suburbs, and is owned by The Power Foundation. WWDL airs southern gospel music and Christian talk and teaching.

History
The station was formerly known as "The Walk", and was owned by Horizon Christian Fellowship of Indianapolis. As "The Walk", WWDL aired a variety of Christian Talk and Teaching programs including; Back to the Bible with Woodrow Kroll, Thru the Bible with J. Vernon McGee, and Kay Arthur.

On May 7, 2015, Horizon Christian Fellowship of Indianapolis filed an application to sell WWDL (and three CPs for translators) to The Power Foundation. The assignee assumed the operations of the station on June 1, 2015. The sale was approved by the FCC on August 3, 2015, and consummated on October 1, 2015, at a purchase price of $140,000.

References

External links

WDL
Southern Gospel radio stations in the United States